Brian John Lister Boyle, DFC (1917-1993) was a South African flying ace of World War II, credited with 5 'kills'.

Boyle was commissioned into the South African Air Force in 1938 and in 1940 was posted to 1 Squadron SAAF in Eritrea, flying a Gladiator. He single handedly engaged 8 Fiat CR.42's on 6 November 1941 and crash landed injured. He received a DFC for this engagement in January 1942. He returned to South Africa at the end of March 1942 as an instructor. In February 1944 he joined 4 Squadron SAAF, flying the Spitfire Mk. V. Boyle was appointed Officer Commanding in April 1944. He was posted to Headquarters in July 1944 and then on to 4 Air School as Commanding Officer.

After the war he remained in the SAAF and retired as a Brigadier. He died in 1993.

References

South African World War II flying aces
1917 births
1993 deaths
South African Air Force personnel of World War II
Recipients of the Distinguished Flying Cross (United Kingdom)
People from East London, Eastern Cape